Achudemia is a genus of plants belonging to the family Urticaceae. It is sometimes also treated as a section of the genus Pilea.

References

Urticaceae
Urticaceae genera
Taxa named by Carl Ludwig Blume